Mountain View is a historic plantation house at Morganton, Burke County, North Carolina. It was built about 1815, and is a -story, five-bay, Federal-style brick house. It was remodeled in the 1870s in the Gothic Revival style. It features a two-story gabled porch with decorative bargeboards. Later remodelings added Victorian- and Colonial Revival-style decorative elements.

It was listed on the National Register of Historic Places in 1984.

References

Plantation houses in North Carolina
Houses on the National Register of Historic Places in North Carolina
Federal architecture in North Carolina
Houses completed in 1815
Houses in Burke County, North Carolina
National Register of Historic Places in Burke County, North Carolina